Anatoliy Ivanovich Blashku (16 November 1944 – 20 March 2021) and was the Minister of Industry of Transnistria.

Biography
Blashku was born on 15 November 1944 in the village Biruința of Sîngerei District of MSSR.

Education
• 1965 graduated from Shevchenko Transnistria State University
• 1972 graduated the PhD studies at the Leningrad A.Ioffe's Institute of Physics and Technology

Career
 January 1967 - November 1969, assistant at the Department of General Physics of the Tiraspol Pedagogical Institute.
 1969 - 1973 – the Research Fellowt, then, the Junior Researcher at the Institute of Applied Physics of the Academy of Sciences of the MSSR.
 from October 1973, worked at the "Moldavizolit" Enterprize, started as the head of the central Enterprise laboratory and then, became the Director of the Enterprise.
 In 1986–1990, deputy at the Tiraspol City Council of People's Deputies.
 February 1997, appointed as the deputy chairman of the PMR government.
 From September 2000 to January 2007 - Minister of Industry of Transnistria.
 2007 - 2011, the assistant of the President of the PMR in industry.

The author of 35 works in the field of physics, the owner of 25 copyright certificates.

Awards and prizes 
Awards 
 Order of Labor Glory
 Order of Honor
 Medal "For Labor Valor"
 Diploma of the President of the Pridnestrovian Moldavian Republic

Prizes
 The prizewinner  of the State Prize in Science and Technology of the MSSR.
 Twice prizewinner of the State Prize of the USSR Council of Ministers.

He died on 20 March 2021, in Tiraspol.

Family
Blashku was married and had two daughters.

References

1944 births
2021 deaths
People from Comrat
Transnistrian politicians